Joel Jessup Farm is a historic home and farm located in Guilford Township, Hendricks County, Indiana.  The farmhouse was built about 1864, and is a two-story, Italianate style brick I-house with a rear kitchen ell.  It has a slate gable roof, round arched windows, and multiple brick chimneys.  Also on the property are the contributing traverse frame barn and privy.

It was added to the National Register of Historic Places in 1998.

References

Farms on the National Register of Historic Places in Indiana
Italianate architecture in Indiana
Houses completed in 1864
National Register of Historic Places in Hendricks County, Indiana
Buildings and structures in Hendricks County, Indiana